Area 12 can refer to:

 Brodmann area 12
 Area 12 (Nevada National Security Site)
 Area 12 (band)